Heaton is a ward in the metropolitan borough of the City of Bradford, West Yorkshire, England. It contains 32 listed buildings that are recorded in the National Heritage List for England.  Of these, four are listed at Grade II*, the middle of the three grades, and the others are at Grade II, the lowest grade.  The ward is to the northwest of the centre of the city of Bradford, and contains the areas of Heaton and Frizinghall.  The southern part of the ward is residential, and the northern part is rural.  Most of the listed buildings are houses, cottages and associated structures, farmhouses and farm buildings.  In the ward is Lister Park, which contains a listed memorial gatehouse and a memorial containing a statue.  The other listed buildings include churches and a presbytery, a public house, a college, and a factory.


Key

Buildings

References

Citations

Sources

 

Lists of listed buildings in West Yorkshire
Listed